Emerald Coast Rider (known as Okaloosa County Transit until 2015) is the public transportation agency that serves the Okaloosa County, Florida. The service was founded in 1987 and served approximately 225,000 riders in 2009. Okaloosa County Transit offers deviated fixed route bus service and limited paratransit service countywide. Branded as The Wave, the agency provides service on weekdays and does the majority of business during the peak tourist season. Okaloosa County Transit also operates paratransit (door to door) service.

Routes
1 Northwest Florida State College to Uptown Station
2 Santa Rosa Mall to Uptown Station
3 Northwest Florida State College to Santa Rosa Mall
4 Walmart Plaza to Uptown Station
11 North Okaloosa Medical Center to The Marketplace
12 Okaloosa County Courthouse to Addison Place Apartments
14 Wave Express from Crestview City Hall to Uptown Station
20 Boardwalk to Uptown Station
30 Boardwalk to East Pass Towers
32 Ninety-Eight Palms Plaza to Destin Commons
33 Silver Sand Outlets to Destin Commons

References

External links
 Emerald Coast Rider (Official Website)

Bus transportation in Florida
Transportation in Okaloosa County, Florida